Stony Lake is a lake in the northern Manitoba, Canada.

Many islands raise from the lake, among them Moffatt Island, Seamen Island (largest) and Radcliffe Island.

Lakes of Manitoba